Antonia Gröndahl (born 25 May 1995) is a Finnish professional racing cyclist, who currently rides for UCI Women's Continental Team . She rode in the women's road race at the 2016 UCI Road World Championships, but she did not finish the race.

References

External links
 

1995 births
Living people
Finnish female cyclists
People from Pargas
Sportspeople from Southwest Finland